Spencerville is a census-designated place in San Juan County, New Mexico, United States. Its population was 1,258 as of the 2010 census.

Geography
Spencerville is located at coordinates . According to the United States Census Bureau, Spencerville has a total area of 8.64 square kilometers, all land.

Demographics

According to the 2010 census, 1,258 people were living in Spencerville. The population density was 145.6 inhabitants per square kilometer. Of the 1,258 inhabitants, Spencerville was composed by 83.23% White, 0.56% were African American, 5.64% were Native American, 0.16% were Asian, 0% were Pacific Islanders, 6.36% were of other races and 4.05% from two or more races. Of the total population 19.87% were Hispanic or Latino of any race.

Education
It is divided between Aztec Municipal Schools (the majority) and Farmington Municipal Schools (a minority section). Aztec High School is the local high school of the former.

References

Census-designated places in New Mexico
Census-designated places in San Juan County, New Mexico